The King of Saudi Arabia, officially the King of the Kingdom of Saudi Arabia, is the monarchial head of state and ruler of Saudi Arabia who holds absolute power. He is the head of the Saudi Arabian royal family, the House of Saud. The king is called the "Custodian of the Two Holy Mosques", a title that signifies Saudi Arabia's jurisdiction over the mosques of Masjid al Haram in Mecca and Al-Masjid an-Nabawi in Medina. The title has been used many times through the history of Islam. The first Saudi monarch to use the title was King Faisal; however, King Khalid did not use the title after him. In 1986, King Fahd replaced "His Majesty" with the title of Custodian of the Two Holy Mosques, and it has been ever since used by both King Abdullah and King Salman bin Abdulaziz.

History
Ibn Saud King Abdul-Aziz (known in the West as Ibn Saud) regained his patrimony, which is known as today's Saudi Arabia in 1902. Restoring his family as emirs of Emirate of Riyadh, he then established Sultanate of Nejd as his headquarters in 1922. Following the establishment of Riyadh as the capital of his state, King Abdulaziz Al-Saud then captured Hejaz in 1925.

Ibn Saud proclaimed his dominions as the Sultanate of Nejd in 1921, shortly before completing the unification of the region. He was proclaimed king/malik of Hejaz in 1926, and raised Nejd to a kingdom as well in 1927. For the next five years, Ibn Saud administered the two parts of his realm, the Kingdom of Hejaz and Nejd as separate units. On 23 September 1932, he formally united his territories into the Kingdom of Saudi Arabia.

Succession

The kings since Ibn Saud's death have all been his sons, and all likely immediate successors to the reigning King Salman will be from among his progeny. This makes the Saudi monarchy quite distinct from Western monarchies, which usually feature large, clearly defined royal families and orders of succession, and use the absolute primogeniture system of succession. Muhammad bin Nayef was the first grandson of Ibn Saud to be in the line of succession before being deposed from the position of Crown Prince by a royal decree in 2017.

Other functions
The king of Saudi Arabia is also considered the head of the House of Saud and prime minister. The crown prince is also the "deputy prime minister". The kings after Faisal have named a "second deputy prime minister" as the subsequent heir after the crown prince.

Royal Standard

The Royal Flag consists of a green flag, with an Arabic inscription and a sword featured in white, and with the national emblem embroidered in gold in the lower right canton.

The script on the flag is written in the Thuluth script. It is the shahada or Islamic declaration of faith:
 
 
There is no other god but Allah, Muhammad is the messenger of God.

The Royal Standard consists of a green flag, in the center of the national emblem embroidered with gold.

Kings of Saudi Arabia (1932–present)

Current heirs-apparent
 Crown Prince: Mohammed bin Salman, born ; son of King Salman and Fahda bint Falah Al Hithlain.

Opposition
Criticism of the King, religious leaders, or government is not allowed and can generally mean jail time for the critics. It can also result in death.

Timeline

See also
List of rulers of Saudi Arabia

References

Saudi Arabia
 
1932 establishments in Saudi Arabia
History-related lists
Saudi Arabia-related lists